Narasingha Prasad Guru is an author and a lyricist from the Indian State of Odisha. He is a pioneer and a promoter of the Koshali language, also known as the Sambalpuri language, which is a language (some people consider it as a dialect of the Odiya language) spoken in the western parts of Odisha. He has composed over 10 books in this language and composed around 500 songs. He has also compiled a dictionary of the Koshali language.

Recognition: Padma Shri

In the year 2022, Govt of India conferred the Padma Shri award, the third highest award in the Padma series of awards, on Narasingha Prasad Guru for his distinguished service in the field of literature and education. The award is in recognition of his service as an "Koshali author, lyricist and lexicographer from Balangir credited with promoting the language for over five decades".

Publications
The books published by Narasingha Prasad Guru include:
Mati Akasha
Paschma Odishara Lok Katha (Vol-1,2)
Ama Loka Gita Loka Nacha
Ama Anchalara Itihas Katha
Ama Anchalara Gaunli Khela
Utara Purusha
Paschima Odishara Darshaniya Stana
Sala Banara Raja
Raja Ghara Maja Katha
Muthae Mati
Tirtha Mati 
Gote Mali Changre Phool,

See also
Padma Shri Award recipients in the year 2022

References

People from Odisha
Recipients of the Padma Shri in literature & education
Year of birth missing (living people)
Living people